Kerry Galen Rich (born ) is an American politician. He is a member of the Alabama House of Representatives from the 26th District, serving since 2010. A member of the Republican party, he also served in the House from 1974 to 1978 and 1990 to 1994. He manages a radio station in Guntersville, Alabama.

References

Living people
Republican Party members of the Alabama House of Representatives
21st-century American politicians
1950s births